Commandant Bory was one of a dozen s built for the French Navy in the first decade of the 20th century.

Design and description
The Bouclier class were designed to a general specification and varied significantly from each other in various ways. Designed to displace , they displaced  at normal load. Their crew numbered 80–83 men.

Commandant Bory was powered by a pair of Rateau steam turbines, each driving one propeller shaft using steam provided by four water-tube boilers. Commandant Bory exceeded that speed, reaching  during her sea trials.

The primary armament of the Bouclier-class ships consisted of two  Modèle 1893 guns in single mounts, one each fore and aft of the superstructure, and four  Modèle 1902 guns distributed amidships. They were also fitted with two twin mounts for  torpedo tubes amidships.

Construction and career
Commandant Bory was ordered from Dyle et Bacalan and was launched from its Bordeaux shipyard on 14 September 1912. The ship was completed the following year.

References

Bibliography

 

Bouclier-class destroyers
Ships built by Dyle et Bacalan
1912 ships